Patriarch Kirilo may refer to:

Kirilo II, Serbian Patriarch, Serbian Patriarch (1759–1763)

See also
Kirilo
Patriarch Cyril (disambiguation)